Crimewatch is a Singaporean television programme produced by the National Crime Prevention Council (NCPC) in collaboration with the Singapore Police Force (SPF). It is aired on Mediacorp's Channel 5, Channel 8, Suria and Vasantham.

Presented by actual serving regular police officers, it showcases the work of the Singapore Police Force including the re-enactments of major solved cases, appeals for unsolved cases, as well as general crime prevention advice in a Singaporean context.

The series first premiered on the English-language Channel 5 on 30 November 1986. Subsequent dubbings of Singapore's other official languages began with Mandarin (绳之以法) on 7 December on Channel 8 that year. The series later implemented Malay dubs for Suria (Jejak Jenayah) starting in 2000, followed by Tamil's Vasantham (Kutra Kannkaanippu) in 2001.

History
Crimewatch first premiered on 30 November 1986 with the first case featuring an unsolved murder of a 19-year-old national serviceman and a public appeal from the victim's parents. Less than two weeks after the episode was broadcast, police were able to identify and arrest the suspects based on information provided by viewers responding to the appeal. The episode also contained a police appeal for information regarding the case of two missing boys Toh Hong Huat and Keh Chin Ann and another murder case. The series was met with positive reception and it has since aired on a monthly basis starting on 1993 with six episodes, before extending to ten episodes the following year. The series aired with only Mandarin dubbing from the start of the series, but it has since been extended to Malay in 1993, followed by Tamil in 1994.

The 2012 season was preceded by a retrospective special titled Crimewatch 25th Anniversary Special airing 19 February 2012 revisiting the series' most memorable moments and interviews by the cast. The special was hosted by television actor Tay Ping Hui, who also performed in numerous crime television series such as C.L.I.F. The 2012 season was also the first season to not feature narration which was implemented since the series' start.

Episodes in English and Mandarin after 1993 and episodes in Malay and Tamil after 2013 can be found on meWATCH and on the Singapore Police Force's YouTube channel.

Production for the 2020 season was postponed for two months from May to June due to the COVID-19 pandemic; reruns of selected episodes took the place of the affected episodes. Due to this postponement, the 2020 season marked the first time the show aired episodes in the months of January and February.

The 2021 season premiered on 25 April 2021, making it the first season to not premiere in March. Production for the 2021 season was also postponed for a month in July due to the COVID-19 pandemic and no new episodes were aired. The 2022 season premiered on 25 April 2022, the second season to not premiere in March.

However, airings of the 2022 season were postponed in September due to the 2022 Singapore Grand Prix. The 2023 season reverted back to its usual premiere date in March, after the 2022 season ends in February.

Format 

Each season of Crimewatch consists of ten episodes (twelve episodes for 1989 and six episodes for 1993) usually aired near the end of every month between March and December every year. The English version is aired on the third or fourth Sunday, and the Mandarin version is aired on the last Friday of the same month. The Malay and Tamil versions are aired on the first Monday and Thursday of the following month respectively.

Most episodes feature a reenactment of crimes that occurred in Singapore that plays for the entirety of the episode, followed by a short segment on other advisories (such as the annual Great Singapore Sale). The segment ends with the presenter narrating the sentences given to the featured criminals (until Crimewatch 2022 Episode 1 for English & Chinese versions) and offering advice to the public for their own protection and safety related to that particular segment. However starting from Crimewatch 2022 Episode 2 (English & Chinese versions), it no longer present the sentences given to the featured criminals on digital platforms but still showing on TV on airdate.

Recent episodes also feature information on scams, including mechanisms, statistics and advice from various government agencies and non-governmental organisations, such as those from the Singapore Police Force's Criminal Investigation Department and the National Crime Prevention Council.

Hosts 
As of 2022, the current presenters for the English version of the series include Deputy Superintendent of Police (DSP) James Goh, DSP Joshua Jesudason, DSP Jonathan Au Yong and DSP Azfer Ali Khan.

The presenters for the Mandarin version is presented by DSP Madeline Low and DSP Koh Chao Rong, the Malay version by ASP Muhamad Omar Shariff and the Tamil version by ASP Kalaichelvan Daniel.

Previous presenters include:

SUPT Jargit Singh (1986–89)
INSP M.F Pardesh (1986–87)
SUPT Tan Ngoh Chew (1987–89)
DSP Philip Mah (1992–95, 2004)
ASP Loy Chye Meng (1993) (Mandarin version)
INSP Tan Chong Kuan (1994–96) (Mandarin version)
DSP Aubeck Kam (1995–98)
ASP Tan Chye Hee (1997–99) (Mandarin version)
ASP Adrian Quek (1998)
ASP Tristan Sim (1999)
ASP Lau Peet Meng (2000)
SUPT Koh Wei Keong (2000–06, 2008, 2020) (Mandarin version)
DSP Audrey Ang (2000–06)
ASP Gail Wong (2007–09)
ASP Lim Tung Li (2007–08) (Mandarin version)
ASP Justin Wong (2009–10) (Mandarin version)
SUPT Jessica Ang (2010–?) (English and Mandarin version)
SUPT Rachel Soh (2012–?) (Mandarin version)
DAC Zed Teo Zi-Ming (2011–14)
DAC Julius Lim (2011–17, 2020)
INSP Nur Baizurah Abu Baker (2012–16) (Malay version)
ASP Azlinda Aziz (2017–19) (Malay version)
INSP Roslinah Rahmat (2017–19) (Malay version)
DSP Zeya Lwin Tun (2017–18)
DSP Jonathan Lim (2020–21)

See also 

 Crimewatch (UK) – British version
 America's Most Wanted, similar programme for the United States of America
 Police Report, similar programme in Hong Kong
 India's Most Wanted, inspired program in India
 Linha Direta, similar program in Brazil
 Efterlyst, similar program in Sweden
 Crimecall, Republic of Ireland
 Crime Watch, similar program in Trinidad and Tobago
 Police 5, London

References

External links 
 Crimewatch

Singaporean documentary television series
Singapore Police Force
Crime in Singapore
Singaporean crime television series